20th Brigade may refer to:

Infantry units
 20th Brigade (Australia)
 20th Indian Brigade, a unit of the British Indian Army in World War I
 20th Indian Infantry Brigade, a unit of the British Indian Army in World War II
 20th Brigade (United Kingdom)
 20th Armoured Infantry Brigade (United Kingdom)
 20th Independent Infantry Brigade (Guards), United Kingdom

Other units
 20th Mounted Brigade, United Kingdom
 XX Brigade, Royal Horse Artillery (T.F.), Territorial Force, United Kingdom
 20th Engineer Brigade (United States)

See also
 20th Army (disambiguation)
 20th Battalion (disambiguation)
 XX Corps (disambiguation)
 20th Division (disambiguation)
 20th Regiment (disambiguation)
 20 Squadron (disambiguation)